Fred Lohse (9 April 1908 – 19 January 1987) was a German composer and music educator.

Life 

Born in Leipzig, Lohse studierte von 1928 bis 1931 musical composition and counterpoint bei Hermann Grabner in Leipzig. From 1928 to 1952, he worked mainly as a music educator. In 1952 he became a docent and in 1973 a Professor for composition and musical theory in musicology at the Universität Leipzig.

Lohse died in Leipzig at the age of 79.

Awards 
 1978 Kunstpreis der DDR

Work

Orchestral music 
Deutscher Reigen 6 Stücke (1936)
1. Sinfonie (1955)
Divertimento für Streichorchester (1957)
2. Sinfonie 1962
3. Sinfonie (Kammersinfonie) (1975)
Konzertmusik für 16 Bläser und Pauken (1976)
Rondo giocoso (Jugend-Sinfonie) (1979)

Chamber music 
Variationen über ein Thema von Wolfgang Amadeus Mozart for violin, violoncello and piano (1931)
Klavierbuch (1937)
2 Sonaten für Viola und Klavier (1955)
Sonate für Violine und Klavier (1958)
1. Streichquartett (1959)
Bläserquintett (1961)
2. Streichquartett (1977)
3. Streichquartett (1978)

Vocal music 
Deutschland 4 Lieder mit Klavier (1951)
Steigendes Jahr 6 Lieder für Sopran und Klavier (1952)
Vier Lieder für gemischten Chor (1953)
Land meines Lebens 4 Chöre (1959)
Sinnsprüche (Goethe) für gemischten Chor (1969)

Publications 
Probleme des zweistimmigen vokalen Satzes (1959)
Die musikalische Linearität des 20. Jahrhunderts als ordnendes Prinzip einer historisch begründeten und neu entwickelten Systematik des Tonsatzes – Leipzig (1967)

References

External links 
 
 

20th-century German composers
20th-century classical composers
Academic staff of Leipzig University
German music educators
1908 births
1987 deaths
Musicians from Leipzig